Six ships of the Royal Navy have borne the name HMS Jasper, after the mineral Jasper:

 was a 10-gun  launched in 1808 and wrecked in 1817.
 was a 10-gun Cherokee-class brig-sloop launched in 1820 and wrecked in 1828. The wreck was sold in 1831.
 was a wooden paddle packet, originally the GPO vessel Aladdin. She was transferred to the navy in 1837, and caught fire and sank in 1854.
 was a  wooden screw gunboat launched in 1855. She ran aground during the Siege of Taganrog later in 1855.
 was an  wooden screw gunboat launched in 1857. She was sold to the Emperor of China in 1862 and renamed Amoy. She was resold to Egypt in 1865.
 was a  launched as HMS Garnet in 1943 and transferred to the Royal Navy under lend-lease. She was renamed HMS Jasper in 1944 and was returned to the US Navy in 1946.

Royal Navy ship names